Adolf Eduard Marschner (Grünberg, Schlesien, 5 March 1819 – Leipzig, 9 September 1853), was a Romantic German composer.

Marschner was related to the well known Heinrich Marschner. He studied music from the age of 10 and then studied at the University of Leipzig where he also later became a music teacher.

In the field of vocal music he has composed app. 30 pieces for voice and piano accompaniment and several songs for men’s choir. The most popular among those are Und hörst du das mächtige Klingen, Das Königslied and Gute Nacht.

Together with Ludwig Richter in 1844-47 he published two song collections named Alte und neue Studenten-Lieder (Old and new Student Songs), and Alte und neue Volks-Lieder (Old and new Folk Songs).

References
 Meike Tiemeyer-Schütte: Das Deutsche Sängerwesen in Südaustralien vor Ausbruch ses Ersten Weltkrieges zwischen Bewahrung von Deutschtum und Anglikanisierung. LIT

External links
 
 

1819 births
1853 deaths
German male classical composers
German Romantic composers
Leipzig University alumni
Academic staff of Leipzig University
People from the Province of Silesia
19th-century classical composers
19th-century German composers
19th-century German male musicians